Loïc Vincent (born 26 January 1980) is a French professional football player. Currently, he plays in the Championnat de France amateur for AFC Compiègne.

He played on the professional level in Liga de Honra for Associação Naval 1º de Maio.

1980 births
Living people
French footballers
French expatriate footballers
Expatriate footballers in Switzerland
Expatriate footballers in Portugal
Associação Naval 1º de Maio players
Nîmes Olympique players
Stade Lavallois players
La Vitréenne FC players
AFC Compiègne players
Association football goalkeepers
Mediterranean Games bronze medalists for France
Mediterranean Games medalists in football
Competitors at the 2001 Mediterranean Games